34th Brigade or 34th Infantry Brigade may refer to:

 34th Brigade (Australia), a unit of the Australian Army
 34 Canadian Brigade Group, a unit of the Canadian Army
 34th Mechanized Infantry Brigade (Greece), a unit of the Greek Army
 34th Indian Brigade of the British Indian Army in the First World War
 34th Indian States Forces Infantry Brigade of the British Indian Army in the Second World War
 34th Infantry Brigade (Romania), a unit of the Romanian Army
 34th Combat Aviation Brigade, a unit of the United States Army

United Kingdom:
 34th (South Midland) Anti-Aircraft Brigade
 34th Armoured Brigade (United Kingdom)
 34th Brigade (United Kingdom)
 34th Brigade Royal Field Artillery

See also
 34th Battalion (disambiguation)
 34th Division (disambiguation)
 34th Regiment (disambiguation)
 34th Squadron (disambiguation)